A cycle count is a perpetual inventory auditing procedure, where you follow a regularly repeated sequence of checks on a subset of inventory. Cycle counts contrast with traditional physical inventory in that a traditional physical inventory ceases operations at a facility while all items are counted. Cycle counts are less disruptive to daily operations, provide an ongoing measure of inventory accuracy and procedure execution, and can be tailored to focus on items with higher value, higher movement volume, or that are critical to business processes. Although some say that cycle counting should only be performed in facilities with a high degree of inventory accuracy (greater than 95%), cycle counting is a means of achieving and sustaining high degrees of accuracy. Cycle counting can be used to identify root causes of problems in control processes and then monitor the effectiveness of the actions to eliminate the root causes. In contrast, identifying root causes of inventory errors, agreeing on actions to eliminate them to the point of perfecting control processes is virtually impossible with traditional inventory audit approaches.

ABC analysis
Most cycle counting applications use ABC analysis, segregating items into various count frequencies using the Pareto method (see below).

Method
There are several methods of selecting which items to count and with what frequency, and each method has strengths and weaknesses.

Pareto method
The Pareto method, derived from the Pareto principle, is to cycle count inventory by percentage of inventory value. Items with a higher determined value are counted more often, while items that have little movement are seldom counted. This approach is usually based on value which appeals to accountants by minimizing the variance in inventory value. The analysis may also be based on usage from an operational point of view. This is perceived as being more efficient from a supply chain management perspective by concentrating effort on higher volume of use items.  The main shortcoming is that low value items may be ignored and cause an entire assembly line to halt while a minor component is re-ordered.

Hybrid
There are also hybrids of the ABC method. The most common would be to use [cost*usage] and adjusted based on certain criteria that's critical to the organization's performance.

Cycle counting by usage only
Cycle counting by usage states that items more frequently accessed should be counted more often, irrespective of value.  Every time an item is added or removed, there is a risk of introducing inventory variance.  Logical inventory zones can be set up to distinguish items depending on how frequently they are touched. This method may be biased against counting higher value inventory or require additional counting to satisfy accounting requirements.

Opportunity Based
This method conducts inventory checks at key points in the material management process. The inventory is audited at re-order points, when a certain amount is used, or when inventory levels are low.

Statistical Process Control
This method uses statistical process control to audit items with the highest chance of inventory inaccuracy.

Geographic
Also known as "location based" or "by surface area". Cycle counting that begins from one end of the company to the other. Combing over each rack or shelf, that is assigned per counter. This method may require planning, in which a map of the company is required and counting forms for the recording of stock information that will then need updating to the inventory management system.

Process Steps Best Practices
The basic process of cycle counting is generate list, audit, review, repeat. It's important to the success of any cycle counting program to have 6S in place prior to beginning.

Organize
The implementation of a 6S culture is important.

 Segregate scrap, expired, and, non-conforming materials from good inventory.
 Store items in an orderly matter. Inventory should be properly identified and stacked evenly in the proper location.
 Everything should be clean and without clutter.
 Bulk items have standard pack sizes and WIP quantities are controlled.
 The stored items have limited access. Responsibility of inventory transactions are defined and clearly understood. Develop specialists that are proficient in auditing inventory and finding solutions to inventory errors.
 Conduct and record daily safety observations to ensure auditors are not at risk of injury.

Generate List
Produce a list of items to audit according to the method best suited for the company.

Audit
Verify quantities using trained personnel.

Review
 Define any problems.
 Measure by increasing the regularity of counts for items that may be affected by perceived problem.
 Analyze the data collected from the repeated counts.
 Improve or design a process to bring inventory accuracy into acceptable tolerances.
 Control or verify the performance of the improved process.

Repeat

Automation
To conduct efficient and accurate cycle counts, many organizations use some form of software to implement an inventory control system, which is part of a warehouse management system.  These systems may include mobile computers with integrated barcode scanners that allow the operator to automatically identify items, and enter inventory counts via keypad. The software transmits data to a database on a host system which can generate inventory reports.

Based on user defined criteria, the software will select a number of items to count at specific locations for the specified period of time.  Ideally, these selections are daily but many companies choose to generate cycle count items weekly.

Many companies perform "mini" physical inventories and call it cycle counts.  Instead of using random or system generated part numbers at specific locations to count, they selectively choose specific locations and count everything in those locations.  As part of their procedures they rotate throughout the plant with the intention of counting every location a minimum of once each year.  This is an effective alternative to true cycle counting where a company may not have the sophistication to utilize cycle counting software.

Risks
Cycle counts, like traditional physical inventory counts, can introduce inventory errors if the process is poorly executed. Multiple locations per item, work in process, and lag in paperwork processing can each contribute to errors. This problem can be mitigated with correct cycle count procedures that specify not only the part number to be counted but also the location it should be in.  Cycle counting is only effective in companies with a well-defined inventory control procedure and a high degree of inventory accuracy.

Cycle counts introduce risks of inventory loss.  Physical counts typically count all inventory in a fixed location and later reconcile with the inventory control system.  A cycle count on the other hand starts with the inventory control system and reconciles to locations.  Its an important distinction.  For example, if inventory exists in location A, B, and C and someone physically moves C to D without transaction, the inventory control system will continue to show inventory in A, B, and C.  At the time of cycle count, the control system will direct the counter to A, B, and C where they will find C missing.  Unless inventory in D, which could be anywhere, is discovered, C will be adjusted to 0 and written off.  Typically D won't be picked up unless a physical count is performed so, an operation that relies only on cycle counts is likely to experience a net loss of inventory.

Goal
The goal of cycle counting is to eliminate counting.

References